Asterix in Britain is a French animated film, written by Pierre Tchernia, produced by Dargaud Films and Les Productions René Goscinny, and released in December 1986. The film is the fifth adaptation of a story from the Asterix comic series, and is based upon the plot from the graphic novel of the same name by René Goscinny and Albert Uderzo. The film's plot focuses on Asterix and Obelix transporting a barrel of Magic Potion to a rebel village of Britons, as they attempt to hold out against the Romans.  The original French release starred Roger Carel and Pierre Tornade in the lead roles, while the English release starred Jack Beaber and Billy Kearns.

Plot
Julius Caesar successfully conquers all of Britain, unaware his men know that one rebel village still holds. Sensing his chief does not have much hope of lasting much longer, Anticlimax decides to travel to Gaul and find his cousin Asterix, in order to secure some of the Magic potion that his village uses to hold back the Romans. The druid Getafix obliges to the request to supply a barrel of potion to help, upon his arrival, with Vitalstatistix assigning Asterix and Obelix, accompanied by Dogmatix, to transport it to Britain. While travelling across the English Channel, the group rescue a Phoenician merchant from pirates, who rewards Asterix with a small bag of mysterious herbs for their assistance. As they resume, the group encounter a Roman galley, much to Obelix's delight - due to missing them in recent weeks - and board it to satisfy his need for a fight.

Unknown to the group as they reach the British shoreline, Roman officer Stratocumulus, a passenger on the galley who was returning to Gaul, overhears Obelix unintentionally state their mission following the fight. Returning to Londinium swiftly, he warns the head of the British Roman command, headed by General Motus, of the situation. The group soon find the Romans on high alert for them, and are forced to hide out in an inn belonging to Gaulix, a native from Gaul. However, Motus orders all wine barrels in the city to be confiscated upon learning the group have arrived in Londinium, causing them to lose their barrel of magic potion along with Gaulix's supply of wine. Although they manage to recover it the following day, thanks to a Roman legion getting drunk trying to taste for the magic potion, Obelix gets drunk and waylays a Roman patrol while they escape with Gaulix's barrels, allowing a thief to steal them.

Asterix and Anticlimax soon track down the thief, and after rescuing Obelix and Gaulix from the Romans, pursue after the culprit. They soon find the barrel was sold on to a druid who is due to umpire a rugby match. The group swiftly reclaim it as the Romans close in, and make for a rowboat to reach Anticlimax's village. However, Stratocumulus manages to intercept them and sinks their rowboat, destroying the barrel in the process. Delighted with this, Motus orders his forces to attack the rebel Briton village the next day. Despite their loss, Asterix comes up with a plan after recalling the herbs they received, and leads the group to Anticlimax's village. Using a pot of hot water, infused with the herbs, the Britons swiftly drink it and find the courage needed to defeat the Romans, much to the disappointment of Motus and Stratocumulus. Delighted at their success, Anticlimax's chief declares Asterix's 'potion' will become the national drink for the Britons.

Asterix and Obelix soon return home in the wake of their victory, where they enjoy a banquet with their village to celebrate their latest adventure. During this time, Asterix asks Getafix what the herbs are, to which he remarks that they are tea, as the film concludes on a still of the Gauls enjoying themselves.

Cast

Additional Voices
 Original: Paul Bisciglia, Bertie Cortez, Ian Marschall, Judy Martinez, Edward Marcus, Joseph Nyavri, Laurence Riesner, Christopher Wells
 English: Steve Gadler, Peter Hudson, Mike Marshall, Judy Rosen-Martinez, Ken Starcevic, Jerry Di Giacomo

See also
 List of animated feature-length films

External links
 

1986 films
1980s French-language films
French animated films
Italian animated films
Asterix films
Films set in prehistoric Britain
Animated films based on comics
Films scored by Vladimir Cosma
1980s children's animated films
Films with screenplays by Pierre Tchernia
Films directed by Pino van Lamsweerde
1980s Italian films
1980s French films